Prof Ian Naismith Sneddon FRS FRSE FIMA OBE (8 December 1919  Glasgow, Scotland – 4 November 2000  Glasgow, Scotland) was a Scottish mathematician who worked on analysis and applied mathematics.

Life

Sneddon was born in Glasgow on 8 December 1919,  the son of Mary Ann Cameron and Naismith Sneddon. He was educated at Hyndland School in Glasgow.

He studied mathematics and physics at the University of Glasgow, graduating with a BSc. He then went to the University of Cambridge, gaining an MA in 1941. From 1942 to 1945, during World War II, he served as a Scientific Officer to the Ministry of Supply. After the war he worked as a Research Officer for H H Wills Laboratory at the University of Bristol. In 1946, he began lecturing in Natural Philosophy (physics) at the University of Glasgow.

In 1950, he received a professorship at University College, North Staffordshire. In 1956, he returned to the University of Glasgow as Professor of Mathematics.

In 1958, he was elected a Fellow of the Royal Society of Edinburgh. His proposers were Robert Alexander Rankin, Philip Ivor Dee, William Marshall Smart and Edward Copson. He won the Society's Makdougall-Brisbane Prize for the period 1956-58. In 1983, he was further elected a Fellow of the Royal Society of London.

He retired in 1985, and died in Glasgow on 4 November 2000.

Family

In 1943, he married Mary Campbell Macgregor.

Research
Sneddon's research was published widely including:
 with Nevill Mott: Wave mechanics and its applications, 1948
 Fourier transforms, 1951
 Special functions of mathematical physics and chemistry, 1956
 Elements of partial differential equations, 1957
 with James George Defares: An introduction to the mathematics of medicine and biology, 1960
 Mixed boundary problems in potential theory, 1966
 Lectures on transform methods, 1967
 with Morton Lowengrub: Crack problems in the classical theory of elasticity, 1969
 The use of integral transforms, 1972
 The linear theory of thermoelasticity, 1974
 Encyclopaedic dictionary of mathematics for engineers and applied scientists, 1976
 The use of operators of fractional integration in applied mathematics, 1979
 with E. L. Ince: The solution of ordinary differential equations, 1987

Awards and honours
Sneddon received Honorary Doctorates from Warsaw University (1873), Heriot-Watt University (1982) University of Hull (1983) and University of Strathclyde (1984).

References

Fellows of the Royal Society
Fellows of the Royal Society of Edinburgh
Scientists from Glasgow
1919 births
2000 deaths
20th-century Scottish mathematicians